The 13th International Brigade – often known as the XIII Dąbrowski Brigade – fought for the Spanish Second Republic during the Spanish Civil War, in the International Brigades. The brigade was dissolved and then reformed on four occasions.

1st Formation

The brigade was first mustered at the International Brigade headquarters in Albacete in December 1936. The custom was to name Brigades on formation after inspirational "heroes of the Left".
The 13th Brigade was named after Jarosław Dąbrowski, a Polish general who died on foreign soil, fighting in the defence of the Paris Commune in 1871. It consisted of three battalions, and three artillery batteries.
 Louise Michel (1) Battalion
 Chapaev Battalion / Czapajew Battalion
 Vuillemin Battalion
 1st Battery "Ernst Thaelmann"
 2nd Battery "Karl Liebknecht"
 3rd Battery "Antoni Gramsci"
This brigade mutinied after receiving heavy casualties the Battle of Brunete in July 1937 . Its battalions were dissolved, the men were sent to other units, and its equipment was re-distributed.

2nd Formation
The brigade was reformed on 4 August 1937, from Central European battalions. It again used Jarosław Dąbrowski as its exemplar.
 Dąbrowski Battalion – Polish and Spanish
 Palafox Battalion – Polish, Spanish, Balkan.
 Rakosi Battalion – Hungarian, Spanish.
 Djuro Djakovic Battalion – Yugoslav.
It was dissolved on 23 September 1938, along with the other International Brigades, when the Negrin Government took the decision to send foreign volunteers home. This decision was taken after pressure from the Non-Intervention Committee to remove all foreign volunteers from both sides of the conflict in an endeavour to de-internationalise it. Negrin acquiesced because he believed the Nationalists would send their foreigners home too.

3rd formation
The brigade was again reformed (in Monredón) on 1 October 1938 from exclusively Spanish conscript battalions.

4th formation

In mid-January 1939, in Palafrugell, Catalonia, a group of Polish and Balkan volunteers requested permission of André Marty to return to fight the Nationalists' Catalonia Offensive. On 23 January, they were formed into the XIII International Brigade. It was placed in charge of a young second lieutenant. The unit soon fell apart.

Brigade Staff

See also
CL International Brigade, also known as "Dabrowski Brigade"

References
 
 Hugh Thomas, The Spanish Civil War
 Cecil Eby, Comrades and Commissars, 2006.

Military units and formations established in 1936
Military units and formations disestablished in 1939
International Brigades
Mixed Brigades (Spain)